
Rupal may refer to :

Places

Pakistan 
 Rupal, Gilgit–Baltistan, a village in Rupal Valley
 Rupal Glacier
 Rupal Peak
 Rupal River
 Rupal Valley
 Rupal, Punjab, a village

Elsewhere
 Rupal, Gandhinagar, Gujarat, India
 Rupal State, a former princely state in Mahi Kantha, Gujarat, India
 Rupal, Nepal

People 
 Rupal Patel, Indian actress

See also 
 RuPaul (born 1960), American performer